Xystocheirini is a tribe of flat-backed millipedes in the family Xystodesmidae. There are about 5 genera and more than 40 described species in Xystocheirini.

Genera
These five genera belong to the tribe Xystocheirini:
 Anombrocheir Buckett & Gardner, 1969
 Motyxia Chamberlin, 1941
 Parcipromus Shelley, 1995
 Wamokia Chamberlin, 1941
 Xystocheir Cook, 1904

References

Further reading

 
 
 
 
 

Polydesmida
Articles created by Qbugbot
Arthropod tribes